Malmir (also Romanized as Mālmīr, Māl-e Mīr, and Māl Mīr) is a village in Malmir Rural District, Sarband District, Shazand County, Markazi Province, Iran. At the 2006 census, its population was 690, in 211 families.

References 

Populated places in Shazand County